The 1896 United States presidential election in Utah was held on November 3, 1896 as part of the 1896 United States presidential election. Voters chose three representatives, or electors to the Electoral College, who voted for president and vice president. This was the first time Utah participated in a presidential election, having been admitted as the 45th state on January 4 of that year.

Democrat William Jennings Bryan carried Utah by an overwhelming 65 point margin over Republican William McKinley—by far the strongest ever performance by any presidential nominee in the state—despite narrowly losing the national election. As such, this is the only time a Republican has won the presidency without winning Utah, starkly contrasting with the state's subsequent status as one of the most staunchly Republican states in the nation.

Background
Utah had been established as a territory within five years of the earliest settlement by the Church of Jesus Christ of Latter-Day Saints, but opposition by the Republican Party – dominant from 1860 – to Mormon polygamy meant that Utah was consistently refused statehood. Consequently, Utah territorial politics until 1891 was dominated by the Mormon-hierarchy-controlled "People's Party" and the anti-Mormon "Liberal Party". Those Mormons who did affiliate with national parties generally were Democrats, who lacked moral qualms associated with polygamy and slavery – although the Liberal Party did have allies within the GOP. In order to achieve statehood, however, the LDS Church disbanded the "People's Party" in 1891 and most LDS members moved towards the Democratic Party.

The 1896 election in Utah was dominated by the influence of silver mine owners, who overwhelmingly supported Democrat/Populist William Jennings Bryan because he advocated coinage of free silver at a ratio of 16-to-1 with gold.

As a consequence, Utah voted overwhelmingly for Bryan, who won the state by 65.43 percentage points, in what remains by far the strongest ever performance by any presidential nominee in the state. Even with Republicans overwhelmingly dominating Utah politics since the 1960s, this margin has not been approached by any party or candidate since. Bryan carried every county except Kane in the far south –  and even here, Bryan's performance remains the second-best ever by a Democrat, behind Woodrow Wilson's narrow 1916 victory – Bryan exceeded sixty-five percent of the vote in every county, and exceeded seventy percent in all but one.

Bryan would later lose Utah to William McKinley four years later and would lose the state again to Republican William Howard Taft in 1908.

Electoral vote
Bryan's support for many Populist goals resulted in him being nominated by both the Democratic Party and the People's Party (Populists), though with different running mates.  One electoral vote from Utah was cast for the Populist Bryan-Watson ticket with Thomas E. Watson as Vice-President and two votes were cast for the Bryan-Sewall ticket.

Results

Results by county

See also
 United States presidential elections in Utah

Notes

References

Utah
1896 Utah elections
1896